Toon Raemaekers (born 9 September 2000) is a Belgian professional footballer who plays for Lierse Kempenzonen, on loan from Mechelen.

Raemaekers made his professional debut for OH Leuven on 11 February 2020 in the home match against Union SG, ending 0–0.

References 

2000 births
Living people
Belgian footballers
Association football defenders
Oud-Heverlee Leuven players
K.V. Mechelen players
Lierse Kempenzonen players
Belgian Pro League players
Challenger Pro League players